Deputatska Street is a street located in Sviatoshynskyi district of the city of Kyiv, areas of Sviatoshyn, Aviamistechko. The street covers the area from Heroes Square of Brest to Nikolai Krasnov Street. 

It was formed in the middle of the twentieth century under the name.

References 

Streets in Kyiv